Nemerenco is a Moldovan surname. Notable people with the surname include:

 Ala Nemerenco (born 1959), Moldovan politician
 Nicolae Nemerenco (born 1992), Moldovan footballer
 Valeriu Nemerenco (born 1959), Moldovan politician

Surnames of Moldovan origin